Brrr or BRRR may refer to:  

Onomatopoeia for shivering
Br-r-r-!, 1959 anthology of horror stories
BRRR (real estate), "buy, rehab, rent, and refinance", a real estate investing strategy
Brrr, a 2023 song by Kim Petras
Brrr – the Cowardly Lion, a character in the 1995 novel Wicked by Gregory Maguire
BR-RR, the ISO-3166 code of the Brazilian state of Roraima

See also
BRR (disambiguation)
BR (disambiguation)
Birr (disambiguation)
Bir (disambiguation)